The following lists events that happened during 1984 in Chile.

Incumbents
President of Chile: Augusto Pinochet

Events

November
29 November – The Treaty of Peace and Friendship of 1984 between Chile and Argentina is signed.

Births
2 February – Johan Fuentes
4 February – Mauricio Pinilla
9 May – Renata Ruiz
23 May – Washington Torres
1 June – Jean Beausejour
12 June – Felipe Barrientos
17 June – Luis Jiménez
10 July – Mark González
2 August – Paulo Garcés
10 August – Osvaldo González
14 September – Emilio Hernández
10 October – Roberto Cereceda
16 October – Nicolás Jofre

Deaths
24 January – Hernán Díaz Arrieta (b. 1891)

References 

 
Years of the 20th century in Chile
Chile